Claudia Lorraine Scott (born 8 October 1957) is a Norwegian/British singer, musician, composer and producer associated primarily with country music and American folk music genres. She is an RN.

She was born in Newcastle, but hails from Bergen, Norway, and moved to Nashville in 1999. She has won the Spellemann Award twice, in 1985 and 2014.

References

External links 
 http://www.claudiascott.com/

1957 births
Living people
Musicians from Bergen
Musicians from Newcastle upon Tyne
English emigrants to Norway
Norwegian women singers
Norwegian country singers
Norwegian expatriates in the United States
Spellemannprisen winners
Melodi Grand Prix contestants
English-language singers from Norway